The indigenous peoples of Oceania are Aboriginal Australians, Papuans, and Austronesians (Melanesians (including Torres Strait Islanders), Micronesians, and Polynesians). These indigenous peoples have a historical continuity with pre-colonial societies that developed on their territories. With the notable exceptions of Australia, New Zealand, Hawaii, New Caledonia, Guam, and Northern Mariana Islands, indigenous peoples make up the majority of the populations of Oceania.

This differs from the term Pacific Islanders, which usually excludes Indigenous Australians, and may be understood to include both indigenous and non-indigenous populations of the Pacific Islands alike.

History

Australia and most of the islands of the Pacific Ocean were colonized in waves of migrations from Southeast Asia spanning many centuries. European and Japanese colonial expansion brought most of the region under foreign administration, in some cases as settler colonies that displaced or marginalized the original populations. During the 20th century several of these former colonies gained independence and nation-states were formed under local control. However, various peoples have put forward claims for indigenous recognition where their islands are still under external administration; examples include the Chamorros of Guam and the Northern Marianas, and the Marshallese of the Marshall Islands, and the Native Hawaiians of Hawaii.

In the pre-Columbian era, humans never reached the handful of  oceanic eastern Pacific islands beyond Easter Island, which itself was settled by the Polynesian Rapa Nui people. Eastern Pacific islands such as the Galápagos and Juan Fernández Islands, while inhabitable, did not have a population of Indigenous Americans or Indigenous Oceanians, which helped them form their own unique ecosystems. Author Don Macnaughtan wrote in 2014, "The last places to be reached were in the southwest Pacific, and in the far eastern Pacific. Settlers reached all the way to Easter Island, 2,300 miles from the coast of South America, by about 700 AD. In the southwest Pacific, voyaging canoes reached New Zealand around 1250 AD, and the remote, cool and windy archipelago of the Chatham Islands around 1500 AD (New Zealand was in fact the last major land mass on the planet settled by humans – Iceland was settled about 800 AD, and Madagascar some hundreds of years earlier.) After New Zealand, the Pacific was full, and long-range voyaging began to decline quite rapidly. A few habitable Pacific islands were never found until Europeans entered the ocean – they rank as amongst the last places on earth discovered by humans. These include the Galápagos Islands, Cocos Island, the Revillagigedos Archipelago, and the Juan Fernández Islands off the coast of South America; Lord Howe Island in the Tasman Sea between Australia and New Zealand; and Midway Island, northwest of Hawaii. They are some of the few places on the planet which have never had an 'indigenous' population." Lord Howe Island was politically integrated into the Australian state of New South Wales, despite being nearly 800 kilometers removed, and Midway is now an unincorporated territory of the United States. All oceanic islands of the eastern Pacific (excluding Clipperton) were eventually annexed by Central America and South America, after going unclaimed for a few hundred years following their initial discoveries. They are now politically associated with those regions, in addition to sometimes being associated with Oceania. The sparse number of current inhabitants are primarily Spanish-speaking Mestizos. A percentage of Easter Islanders have race-mixed with Mestizo settlers from their current political administrators, Chile, and it has gradually become a bilingual island, where both Spanish and their native language is spoken. Despite this, the inhabitants still view themselves as Polynesians, and by extension Indigenous Oceanians, not South Americans. Linguistics in Oceania (1971) and Island Realm: A Pacific Panorama (1974) both have broad definitions of Oceania, and define eastern Pacific settlers and post-colonial Easter Islanders as making up a Spanish-speaking segment of Oceania.

The Bonin Islands, located about 1,000 to 2,000 kilometers from Tokyo, are commonly thought to have been uninhabited during pre-Columbian times, even though there may have possibly been a Micronesian presence on the islands approximately 2,000 years ago. The islands are still sometimes associated with Oceania, despite now having become politically integrated into Japan. Today, they are sparsely inhabited by Japanese citizens, with a proportion having European and European American ancestry. The European proportion are not recent immigrants, but rather descendants of early settlers, as the islands were not always within the sphere of Japanese colonial influence. Islanders primarily speak Japanese, and like with those in the eastern Pacific, they could be interpreted as one of the smaller linguistic groups in Oceania.

Remoter and more uninhabitable islands adjacent to Micronesia may have had fleeting contact with Indigenous Oceanians, with Howland Island and Wake Island being examples. Norfolk Island (adjacent to Melanesia) and Pitcairn Islands (adjacent to Polynesia) were uninhabited when discovered by Europeans, but there is substantial evidence of prehistoric Indigenous Oceanian settlement. Pitcairn currently have a population of around 50, who are entirely mixed-race Anglo Euronesians. They are descended from an initial group of Anglo and Polynesian settlers in the 18th century. Pitcairn was later annexed by Britain, while Norfolk Island became an external territory of Australia, who are over 1,500 kilometers removed. Norfolk's present population is mostly European Australian, some are also Euronesians; these individuals are descended from Pitcairn Islanders that were relocated to Norfolk in 1852 because of overpopulation. The Micronesia adjacent islands became unincorporated territories of the United States, and they all have no permanent residents. The United States government restrict access to outsiders on some islands.

Decolonization
Oceania is generally considered the least decolonized region in the world. In his 1993 book France and the South Pacific since 1940, Robert Aldrich commented:

Demographics 

In New Zealand, Māori constitute a significant minority, accounting for 16% of the total population according to the 2018 census. A considerable number of those who define themselves as Māori are also of European, and to a lesser but growing extent, of Asian descent.  

The indigenous peoples of Australia are the Indigenous Australians, who account for 2.5% of the total population according to 2011 census figures. The term 'Indigenous Australians' refers to both the Aboriginal peoples of mainland Australia and Torres Strait Islander peoples. Of the total 'Indigenous Australian' population, 90% identified as Aboriginal only, 6% identified as Torres Strait Islander and the remaining 4% identified as being of both Aboriginal and Torres Strait Islander origin.

Papua New Guinea (PNG) has a majority population of indigenous societies, with some 700+ different tribal groups recognised out of a total population of just over 5 million. The PNG Constitution and other Acts identify traditional or custom-based practices and land tenure, and explicitly sets out to promote the viability of these traditional societies within the modern state. However, several conflicts and disputes concerning land use and resource rights continue between indigenous groups, the government and corporate entities.

Migration between countries and territories in Oceania
Hawaii boasts a large Micronesian population (including Guamese Chamorros), with many Micronesians having experienced discrimination at the hands of the native Polynesian Hawaiians. Migrants from areas such as the Federated States of Micronesia have also faced discrimination in Guam itself, despite both being ethnoculturally Micronesian.

New Zealand has the largest population of Polynesians in the world; it consists not only of their native Māori population, but also of immigrants from other Polynesian islands, including the Cook Islands, Samoa and Tonga. Australia has the third largest Polynesian population, in addition to having the largest Fijian population outside of Fiji. Australia's Polynesian population consists of Māoris, as well as immigrants who originate from the same countries as the ones who migrated to New Zealand. In 2022, there was controversy over proposals to build a traditional Māori meeting house (known as a Marae) in Sydney. This was seen as disrespectful to Aboriginal Australian landowners, as the Māori are not indigenous to Australia.

List of countries and islands by ethnocultural grouping

Indigenous Australian

 
 
 
 
 
 
 
 
 
 
 
 
 
 
 
 
  (Also known as Niiwalarra)

Melanesian
 
 
 
 
 
 
 
 
 
 Maluku islands

Micronesian

Polynesian

None (uninhabited or unused prior to European discovery)
 
 
 
 
 
  (Also known as Marcus Island)

See also

 Europeans in Oceania
 List of indigenous peoples of Oceania
 Pacific Islander
 Taiwanese indigenous peoples

Notes

References

Further reading

External links
 Dutch Centre for Indigenous Peoples (NCIV)
 Speaking4Earth: action site for indigenous issues
 Australian Institute of Aboriginal and Torres Strait Islander Studies